Wauchula Municipal Airport  is a public-use airport located  southwest of the central business district of the city of Wauchula in Hardee County, Florida, United States. The airport is publicly owned.

Facilities and aircraft

Wauchula Municipal Airport covers an area of 106 acres (43 ha) at an elevation of 106 feet (32 m) above mean sea level. It has one runway:
18/36 is 4,005 by 75 feet (1,221 x 23 m) asphalt runway. 

For the 12-month period ending July 25, 2018, the airport had 8,200 aircraft operations, an average of 22 per day: 100% general aviation. In April 2022, there were 24 aircraft based at this airport: 18 single-engine, 2 multi-engine and 4 helicopter.

References

External links

Airports in Florida
Transportation buildings and structures in Hardee County, Florida